The Tower of the Americas is a  observation tower-restaurant located in the Hemisfair district on the southeastern portion of Downtown San Antonio, Texas, United States. The tower was designed by San Antonio architect O'Neil Ford and was built as the theme structure of the 1968 World's Fair, HemisFair '68.  It was named as a result of a name the tower contest created by the executive committee.  68 people submitted the name the tower is now known by.

It was the tallest observation tower in the United States from 1968 until 1996, when the Las Vegas Stratosphere Tower was completed. The tower is the tallest occupiable structure in San Antonio, and it is the 30th-tallest occupiable structure in Texas.

The tower is located in the middle of the former HemisFair '68 site and has an observation deck that is accessible by elevator for a fee. There is also a lounge and revolving restaurant at the top of the tower that provides panoramic views of the city.

Construction history

Construction of the tower began on August 9, 1966 and cost $5.2 million. The top house of the tower was constructed at ground level and hoisted to the top of the poured concrete shaft. As the top house was being hoisted into place, on October 30, 1967 some of the cables used to hoist it snapped, leaving it resting and precariously tilted on the tower's shaft. Eventually, oil field pipes were used in lieu of cables to complete the job. It was completed in approximately 18 months, though not quite in time for the fair's opening ceremonies held on April 6, 1968.  It was opened to the public five days later on April 11.  The top house still had not been finished, with construction materials and lumber strewn about.

Tower restaurant

In 2004, Landry's Restaurants, Inc. won the bid for a 15-year lease to manage and operate the property for its owner, the City of San Antonio. Landry's undertook an extensive $8 million renovation of the existing restaurant and lounge and observation deck and added a 4-D film "ride" called "Skies Over Texas," that gives the history of Texas in a film format. Additionally, Landry's spent another $4 million to add approximately 200% more space for ground level attractions such as a gift shop and cafe. Renovations were completed and the tower re-opened with the new Eyes Over Texas Restaurant, Bar 601 and the Flags Over Texas observation deck on June 21, 2006. The restaurant rotates slowly, and observation deck entry is included in the cost of a tower ticket.

In September 2007, Landry's converted the Eyes Over Texas Restaurant into one of its Chart House outlets.

Prior to Landry's, Frontier Enterprises (owner of San Antonio-based Jim's Restaurants) operated the tower of the Americas' restaurant for more than three decades.

Tower heights

750 ft (229 m) to top of the antenna.
622 ft (190 m) to top of roof.
579 ft (176 m) to indoor observation deck.
560 ft (170 m) to outdoor observation deck.
550 ft (168 m) to restaurant and stationary level.

FM radio
Since 1970 the roof has hosted a  tapered steel mast, used as support for three FM antennas; 101.9 KQXT (then known as KCOR-FM), 102.7 KJXK (then KTFM), and 104.5 KZEP (then KITE-FM). In 2007, the three individual antennas were replaced by a 16-bay master antenna that radiates all three FM signals including the HD signal for KQXT. Clear Channel Radio and Electronics Research Inc. headed up the project along with their contractors and involved the City of San Antonio and Landry's Restaurants. The new antenna system improved coverage for all three radio stations. An option existed for several years to add facilities for a move in signal on 97.7 (requiring rearrangement of ten other stations) to share the site. This was organized by Bret Huggins and David Stewart of Rawhide Radio, LLC (partly owned by Hispanic Broadcasting now Univision radio).

Transmitters are located between the public areas of the observation deck and the revolving restaurant in equipment bays along with air conditioners and plumbing.

Trivia

The fastest recorded time up the tower's 952 steps is 5 minutes 18 seconds on January 29, 1981.

See also

List of Towers
Tower Life Building
List of revolving restaurants

References
"A Guide to the San Antonio Fair, Inc., Records, 1963-1995 (Bulk 1964-1968)". Texas Archival Resources Online. Retrieved Feb. 9, 2006.

External links
History of the Tower of the Americas research guide with archival photographs
Tower of the Americas restaurant
Emporis: Tower of the Americas
 
FCC-Entry

Towers completed in 1968
Tourist attractions in San Antonio
Buildings and structures in San Antonio
Towers in Texas
Observation towers in the United States
Towers with revolving restaurants
Restaurants in San Antonio
World's fair architecture in Texas
HemisFair '68
1968 establishments in Texas